St John's Beaumont School is a private day and boarding Jesuit preparatory school, and is for boys aged 3 to 13 years old. It is situated between Englefield Green and Old Windsor on Priest's Hill, with the school building in Surrey and the sports fields in Berkshire. It was opened in 1888, and it is the oldest purpose-built preparatory school in the UK. The building is Grade II listed and was designed by John Francis Bentley in Tudor style with a Perpendicular chapel, and it was named St John's, in honour of St John Berchmans, who was canonised that year.

History
The school was founded by the Roman Catholic Society of Jesus and was built as a preparatory school for Beaumont College.  On 25 September 1888 the school was opened by the Bishop of Southwark, John Baptist Butt.

In 1970, after an initial period of uncertainty following the closure of Beaumont College in 1967, the governors of Stonyhurst College accepted responsibility for St John's. However students go on, as well as to Stonyhurst, to nearer schools such as Eton College, Winchester College, Radley College and Harrow.

Facilities
It is located 11 miles away from both Heathrow Airport and Central London.

The school was built initially for 60 boys aged between 7 and 13 and this can still be seen in the provision of 60 carved wooden chapel pews and 60 individual dormitory cubicles. However, the school has expanded both its classroom provision and its facilities to accommodate over 300 pupils.

In 1993 a new swimming pool with four lanes was opened by David Wilkie, a former Olympic Champion and world record holder; it is run by a separate organisation called The Development Company.  In October 2009, a new sports centre was opened by Queen Elizabeth II, giving the school day pupils, boarders and the local community access to football, cricket, judo and rock climbing of a 30-foot wall.

List of headmasters

 Fr J. Lynch SJ (1888–1894)
 Fr M. Cullen SJ (1894–1897)
 Fr J. Lynch SJ (1897–1902)
 Fr J. O'Gorman SJ (1902–1904)
 Fr T. Ellison SJ (1904–1907)
 Fr R. Dalrymple SJ (1907–1908)
 Fr F.W.Green SJ (1908–1917)
 Fr J. Manning SJ (1917–1918)
 Fr G. Sexton SJ (1918–1929)
 Fr J. Hill SJ (1929–1936)
 Fr J. Sharkey (1936–1946)
 Fr E. Basset SJ (1946–1949)
 Fr T. Dunphy SJ (1949–1964)
 Fr K. McHugh SJ (1964–1970)
 Fr I. St Lawrence SJ (1970–1974)
 Fr C. Taunton SJ (1974–1978)
 Fr B. Walker SJ (1978–1984)
 Mr B. Duffy (1984–1987)
 Mr D. Gogarty (1987–2005)
 Mr G. Delaney (2006–2022)

See also 
 List of Jesuit sites in the United Kingdom
 List of Jesuit schools

References

External links

 Official site

Private schools in the Royal Borough of Windsor and Maidenhead
Preparatory schools in Surrey
Roman Catholic private schools in the Diocese of Arundel and Brighton
Jesuit schools in the United Kingdom
Educational institutions established in 1888
1888 establishments in England
Grade II listed buildings in Berkshire
Grade II listed buildings in Surrey
Old Windsor
Catholic boarding schools in England
Preparatory schools in Berkshire